Swatantra Dev Singh is an Indian politician and currently he is cabinet minister in the Ministry of Jal Shakti, Government of Uttar Pradesh. He got an opportunity to represent the Bundelkhand region in the Yogi government and was made a minister with independent charge in the Yogi government.

Swatantra Dev Singh, who comes from Kurmi caste, was the first person in his family to enter politics and subsequently join BJP. He is one of the most prominent faces of OBCs in Uttar Pradesh.

Early life 
Swatantra Dev Singh was born on 13 February 1964 in Ori village of Jamalpur block of Mirzapur district. His mother's name was Rama Devi and father's name was Allar Singh. They were married in Sigar village of Jhansi district. Born in Mirzapur district, Swatantra Dev Singh made Jalaun of Bundelkhand a work land. While starting politics from here, today his sting started ringing in the entire state. Born in a family with no political background, Swatantra Dev is the first person in his family who is joining RSS and currently playing an active role in the politics of the state through a political party like BJP. He is a member of agricultural Kurmi caste.

Swatantra Dev's family situation was very bad but his elder brother Shripat Singh got a job in the police, who was appointed in Jalaun. Due to poor family situation, Swatantra Dev Singh was brought to Jalaun by his elder brother Shripat, where he got his studies done from Jalaun. From here Swatantra Dev stepped into politics. Swatantra Dev Singh started his politics with the student union elections. He contested the election of student union president from DVC College located in Orai headquarters of Jalaun but he lost. After that in 1986, joining the RSS, he started working as a pracharak of the Sangh as a volunteer. He joined Akhil Bharatiya Vidyarthi Parishad (ABVP) from 1988-89 as organization minister. In 1991, BJP became in-charge of the youth wing of Kanpur. Later he made his political debut in 1994 as a pure politician in charge of the Yuva Morcha of Bundelkhand. In 1996, he was appointed the General Secretary of Yuva Morcha. In 1998, he was again made the General Secretary of BJP State Yuva Morcha. In 2001, he also became the state president of BJP's Yuva Morcha.

He started his education from a primary school in his village Ori. He had great interest in sports and was the captain of his school's wrestling team.

He went on to get a degree of Bachelor of Science (BSc) from Bundelkhand University in Jhansi. During his college days he got connected with Akhil Bharatiya Vidyarthi Parishad (ABVP) which is all India student organization affiliated with the Rashtriya Swayamsevak Sangh (RSS). Swatantra Dev Singh started his journey as a reporter in one of the Hindi language daily newspapers prior in 1986. He is married, he has two daughters and one son.

Political background
In 2004, Swatantra Dev Singh was elected a member of the Jhansi- Jalaun- Lalitpur Legislative Council from Bundelkhand and was also made the State General Secretary. He was made the state general minister twice from 2004 to 2014. Earlier in 2010, BJP made him the state vice-president, later in 2012 again became the general minister and by staying in this post, in 2017 BJP got a huge victory in Bundelkhand region. In 2013, he was made in-charge of West Uttar Pradesh.

Swatantra Dev Singh was made in-charge of the BJP membership campaign in the state in 2014, in which Swatantra Dev Singh had proved his leadership ability by making more than one crore new members from across the state. Swatantra Dev Singh had organized the BJP Yuva Morcha convention in 2002 during the time of Prime Minister Atal Bihari Vajpayee. Under his leadership, he led the BJP's Seema Jagran Yatra (Saharanpur to Pilibhit border, Gorakhpur to Bihar). He was the chief in-charge of the Ganga Yatra of Union Water Resources Development Minister Uma Bharti from Moradabad to Ballia. In the same 2009, he was the main organizer of the rally of BJP's prime ministerial candidate Lal Krishna Advani.

From the Lok Sabha elections to the Legislative Assembly elections in U.P., the rallies of PM Modi are considered to be a big hand in making it successful. Swatantra Dev Singh camped at that place a week before PM Modi's rally, so that he can make the rally successful in any way while infusing enthusiasm and energy among the small workers.

Positions held 
 ABVP General Secretary (Organization) - 1990
 BJYM In-Charge of Kanpur - 1991
 BJYM In-Charge of Bundelkhand region - 1994-1996
 BJYM State General Secretary - 1996-2001
 Chairman of District Cooperative Bank, Jalaun 
 Member of State Legislative Council - 2004-2010 
 BJP State General Secretary (Thrice) - 2004-2017
 BJP Vice President - 2010-2012
 BJP Membership In-Charge - 2014-2015
 Deputed in Gujarat Assembly Elections - 2017
 Deputed in Karnataka Assembly Elections - 2018
 Deputed in Madhya Pradesh Assembly Elections - 2018-19
 BJP In-Charge of Madhya Pradesh Lok Sabha Elections - 2019
 Minister of State (Independent Charge), Transport & Minister of State, Protocol & Power - 2017-2019
President: BJP Uttar Pradesh 2019 -2022
Currently Cabinet minister of Jal Shakti, Government of Uttar Pradesh

References 

For More Information - https://swatantradev.co.in/

For Daily Updates Please Like Facebook Page - https://www.facebook.com/SwatantraDevSingh

For Daily Updates Follow Twitter - https://twitter.com/swatantrabjp

For Latest Videos - https://www.youtube.com/results?search_query=swatantra+dev+singh

Instagram Link- https://www.instagram.com/swatantrabjp/

Living people
Members of the Uttar Pradesh Legislative Council
Bharatiya Janata Party politicians from Uttar Pradesh
State cabinet ministers of Uttar Pradesh
Yogi ministry
People from Mirzapur district
1964 births
State Presidents of Bharatiya Janata Party